"Ismael" / "Varje gång du möter min blick" is double A-side single by Swedish alternative rock band Kent. It was released on 8 October 2010 as the second single from their ninth studio album, En plats i solen. The single was released as a CD single limited to 1000 copies. It is their third double A-side single following the album's lead single "Gamla Ullevi" / "Skisser för sommaren" and "FF" / "VinterNoll2" from Vapen & ammunition.

Track listing

Charts

References

Kent (band) songs
2010 singles
Song recordings produced by Joshua (record producer)
Songs written by Joakim Berg
Songs written by Martin Sköld